Gwaun-Cae-Gurwen is an electoral ward of Neath Port Talbot county borough, Wales.  The ward of Gwaun-Cae-Gurwen along with the Lower Brynamman electoral ward makes up the parish of Gwaun-Cae-Gurwen.

Gwaun-Cae-Gurwen consists of some or all of the following settlements: Cwmgors, Gwaun-Cae-Gurwen and Gwaun-Leision in the parliamentary constituency of Neath.  Gwaun-Cae-Gurwen consists of a built up area to the west and north, surrounded by farmland.  The south eastern part of the ward consists of open moorland.

Gwaun-Cae-Gurwen is bounded by the wards of Quarter Bach of Carmarthenshire to the north; Lower Brynamman and Cwmllynfell to the east; Pontardawe to the south; and Glanamman of Carmarthenshire to the west.

In the 2017 local council elections, the electorate turnout was 
%.  The results were:

Electoral wards of Neath Port Talbot